Gamma-soluble NSF attachment protein is a SNAP protein that in humans is encoded by the NAPG gene.

Function 

NSF and SNAPs (NSF attachment proteins) are general elements of the cellular membrane transport apparatus. The sequence of the predicted 312-amino acid human protein encoded by NAPG is 95% identical to that of bovine gamma-SNAP. NAPG mediates platelet exocytosis and controls the membrane fusion events of this process.

References

Further reading

Human proteins